The Bishop of Kingston (technically of Kingston upon Thames or, originally, of Kingston-on-Thames) is an episcopal title used by an area bishop of the Church of England Diocese of Southwark, in the Province of Canterbury, England. The title takes its name after Kingston upon Thames, a settlement in south-west London. The bishops suffragan of Kingston have been area bishops since the Southwark area scheme was founded in 1991.

On 15 December 2022, it was announced that Martin Gainsborough is to become the next area Bishop of Kingston during February 2023.

List of bishops

References

External links
 Crockford's Clerical Directory - Listings

Bishops of Kingston
Anglican suffragan bishops in the Diocese of Southwark